Grabenstätt is a municipality in the district of Traunstein in Bavaria, Germany.

References

Traunstein (district)